During the 2000–01 English football season, Tranmere Rovers F.C. competed in the Football League First Division.

Season summary
In the 2000–01 season, the all-white kit was reintroduced and they enjoyed yet another run in Cup competitions. In the FA Cup, Tranmere stunned local Premier League team Everton 3–0 at Goodison Park in the fourth round, then Southampton 4–3 in the fifth round replay after being 0–3 down. Their run of good fortune ended with a loss to Liverpool in the FA Cup quarter finals. They nevertheless struggled in League matches, Aldridge quit before Tranmere's relegation to Division Two ended a spell of ten years in Division One.

Final league table

Results
Tranmere Rovers' score comes first

Legend

Football League First Division

FA Cup

League Cup

First-team squad
Squad at end of season

Left club during season

References

Tranmere Rovers F.C. seasons
Tranmere Rovers